Clipper Logistics plc is a retail logistics company based in Leeds which serves retailers selling fashion, tobacco, alcohol and other high-value goods in the UK and Europe.  It has 47 sites across Europe. The company was listed on the London Stock Exchange until it was acquired by GXO Logistics in May 2022.

History

Early history
Steve Parkin founded Clipper Group in 1992 with one van delivering clothing for fashion stores.
The company won a number of contracts in the early years with retailers such as Huddersfield-based Bonmarché and Sir Philip Green which helped it to become established in the transport, haulage and warehousing market. The company made a number of acquisitions in the 2000s including DTS logistics Ltd, Gagewell Transport Ltd and Northern Commercials (Mirfield) Ltd  In 2014 the company was floated on the London Stock Exchange with a valuation of £100 million.

Takeover Attempt
In November 2019, investment fund Sun Capital Partners, Inc. announced it was considering making a bid for the company, supported by founder and executive chairman Steve Parkin. Discussions regarding a possible offer took place between the parties, and the views of a number of independent Clipper shareholders were sought. However, the board and Sun Capital were unable to agree terms, consequently, both sides agreed to terminate discussions.

Coronavirus pandemic support
In March 2020, the company was given a contract by the NHS Supply Chain for the delivery of personal protective equipment to NHS trusts and care homes. This was considered to be controversial amid a scandal over the appointment of COVID-19 contracts in the United Kingdom and alleged cronyism in the British government, as Parkin is a top Conservative Party donor who has attended Leader's Group meetings ("the premier supporter Group of the Conservative Party") and donated £725,000 to the Conservative Party. The company reported 38.2 percent rise in interim pre-tax profits aided by "a successful Black Friday weekend" and was helped by a "significant increase in supporting Supply Chain Co-ordination (NHS) with the storage and distribution of PPE", processing "over 7.4 billion items of PPE on the NHS contract".

Charity
In May 2020, the company donated a refrigerated trailer to the food bank run by Leeds United Foundation and Leeds City Council.

Takeover
On 28 February 2022 GXO Logistics made a recommended offer for the company. In May 2022, it was announced the acquisition had been completed.  According to GXO  this will vastly increase the scope of its reverse logistics services, and provide a bridgehead into Germany. Clipper has been strong in repairs and returns logistics, especially in consumer electronics, and repaired around 1.5 million items during the year ended 30 April 2022.

Operations
 Superdry: It operates a distribution centre for Superdry in Burton-upon-Trent which is to be equipped with 46 Hikrobots, 1,000 transportable pick-wall modules and twelve pick-to-light stations.

 John Lewis: In 2016 Clipper and John Lewis Partnership formed a joint venture now known as Clicklink Logistics Limited to provide click & collect services to high-street retailers.

 Arcadia: In June 2020 it was announced that clipper would be taking over the logistics operation for Arcadia Group from the current provider DHL. DHL decided not to renew the contract with Arcadia in a strategy designed to move away from low margin high risk contracts.

Corporate Affairs

Financials

Controversies
Staff at the company warehouse in Ollerton, Nottinghamshire complained in March 2020 that they were "crammed into corridors" and given no hand sanitiser.

Sponsorship
Clipper has been a sponsor of Leeds United football club since 2017.

References

External links
 Official website

Companies based in Leeds
Logistics companies of the United Kingdom
Companies listed on the London Stock Exchange
British companies established in 1992
Logistics companies
Transport operators of England